Otodontidae is an extinct family of sharks belonging to the order Lamniformes. Its members have been described as megatoothed sharks. They lived from the Early Cretaceous to the Pliocene, and included genera such as Carcharocles and Otodus, including the giant megalodon. Recent studies of the newly described genus Megalolamna indicate that the members of the genus Carcharocles should be reclassified as members of the genus Otodus. The genus Cretalamna which lived from the mid-Cretaceous-Paleogene is believed to be directly ancestral to Otodus, and thus to megalodon.

References 

 
Shark families
Albian first appearances
Pliocene extinctions